Sushma is a female given name in India and Nepal. It means "sparkling beauty" or beautiful women.

Notable people with the name include:
 Sushma Joshi  (born 1973), Nepali writer and filmmaker
 Sushma K. Rao, Indian television actress
 Sushma Karki, Nepali model and actress
 Sushma Rana, professional Indian shooter
 Sushama Reddy (born 1973), Indian model, VJ, actress and producer
 Sushma Seth, Indian film, television, and stage actress
 Sushma Shrestha (born c. 1960), Nepali singer
 Sushma Singh, Chief Information Commissioner of India
 Sushma Swaraj (born 1952), Indian politician

References 

  

Indian feminine given names
Nepalese feminine given names